Fields Park Pontllanfraith A.F.C. were a Welsh football club who played in Welsh Football League and were formed in 1992 after a merger between Fields Park and Pontllanfraith.

Honours

Welsh Football League Division Two (Fourth Tier of the Welsh Football Pyramid) – Champions: 1999–2000
Welsh Football League Cup – Runners-Up: 2000–01

Welsh Football League history
Information sourced from the Football Club History Database for Fields Park Pontllanfraith and the Welsh Soccer Archive.

Notes

References

Football clubs in Wales
1992 establishments in Wales
Association football clubs established in 1992
Welsh Football League clubs
2005 disestablishments in Wales
Association football clubs disestablished in 2005
Defunct football clubs in Wales